Autismo no Feminino is a book by Brazilian writers Sophia Mendonça and Selma Sueli Silva. The work was launched on March 8, 2022, during International Women's Day. The book brings texts by women researchers and activists in the field of autism in Brazil about the autistic experience in women.

Book's Overview 
Autismo no Feminino presents thirteen chapters written by autistic women, diversified and reflective, mixing scientific articles and experience reports. All the authors had as their motto the “cry”: “What do you think society needs to know about autism in females?”. The book has the preface “Diagnosis is Identity”, by the neuropsychiatrist Raquel Del Monde, and ends with “Diagnosis is Hope”, by Ana Amélia Cardoso, professor and researcher at the Department of Occupational Therapy and the Postgraduate Course in Studies at Occupation at the School of Physical Education, Physiotherapy and Occupational Therapy at the Federal University of Minas Gerais (EEFFTO – UFMG). Throughout the work, the authors weave the notions of “identity” and “hope” that pulsate in the construction of the history of each one of them.

For Silva and Mendonça, for a long time, women were ignored in studies on autism. Now, many are coming out of invisibility to take the subject to social networks and academia, promote lectures, research, create companies to spread reliable information. The activism of these women is a consequence of the lack of knowledge and even the distortion about the characteristics of autism in females. All of them went through cruel experiences towards the diagnosis.

Reception 
Autismo no Feminino served as a reference for the production of scientific research on the Autistic Spectrum.

References 

2022 non-fiction books
Brazilian non-fiction books
Books about autism
Books about autistic women
Books by Sophia Mendonça